Chris Annakin (born 30 January 1991) is an English professional rugby league footballer who plays as a  forward for the Dewsbury Rams in the Betfred Championship.

He has played for Wakefield Trinity in the Super League, and spent time on loan from Wakefield at Workington Town in Championship 1, and Featherstone Rovers, London Broncos and the Dewsbury Rams in the Championship.

Background
Annakin was born in Dewsbury, West Yorkshire, England.

Career
He appears for the club sporadically, enduring somewhat of a nightmare 2014 season, as in his 3rd appearance of the season, he was banned for 5 matches for a dangerous throw.

References

External links
Wakefield Trinity profile
Wakefield profile
SL profile
Wakefield Trinity’s returning Chris Annakin eager to lock horns with Leeds Rhinos

1991 births
Living people
English rugby league players
Featherstone Rovers players
London Broncos players
Rugby league players from Dewsbury
Rugby league second-rows
Wakefield Trinity players
Workington Town players
Dewsbury Rams players